Xavier Siméon (born 31 August 1989) is a Grand Prix motorcycle racer from Belgium, competing in the MotoE World Cup. He is the winner of the 2009 FIM Superstock 1000 Championship and the 2006 European Superstock 600 Championship and the winner of the 2021 24 Hours Moto of Le Mans endurance race on Suzuki together with Sylvain Guintoli and Gregg Black.

Two years later, Siméon achieved his first victory at the 2015 German Grand Prix at the Sachsenring. In doing so, he became only the third Belgian rider to win a motorcycle Grand Prix, after de Radiguès and Julien Vanzeebroeck. Siméon won the 2019–20 FIM Endurance World Championship with the Suzuki Endurance Racing Team with team-mates Gregg Black and Etienne Masson and the 2021 FIM Endurance World Championship with team-mates Gregg Black and Sylvain Guintoli.

Career statistics

Grand Prix motorcycle racing

By season

By class

Races by year
(key) (Races in bold indicate pole position, races in italics indicate fastest lap)

References

External links

 

1989 births
Living people
Belgian motorcycle racers
Moto2 World Championship riders
FIM Superstock 1000 Cup riders
Sportspeople from Brussels
Avintia Racing MotoGP riders
MotoGP World Championship riders
MotoE World Cup riders